Denis Anatolyevich Gnezdilov (born 9 October 1986) is a Russian Paralympic athlete who specializes in the F40 shot put event. 

Gnezdilov was born in Rustavi, Georgia, with a congenital dwarfism disorder. He then moved to Sochi, Russia, where he started training in the shot put in 2015. He debuted internationally in 2019, winning the F40 shot put event at the World Championships. Two years later he won a gold medal at the 2020 Paralympics, setting a world record.

References

External links 
 

1986 births
Living people
Russian male shot putters
Cerebral Palsy category Paralympic competitors
Paralympic athletes of Russia
Paralympic medalists in athletics (track and field)
Paralympic gold medalists for the Russian Paralympic Committee athletes
Athletes (track and field) at the 2020 Summer Paralympics
Medalists at the 2020 Summer Paralympics
People from Rustavi
21st-century Russian people